The Headwaters Forest Reserve is a group of old growth coast redwood (Sequoia sempervirens) groves in the Northern California coastal forests ecoregion near Humboldt Bay of the U.S. state of California.

The climate is characterized by maritime conditions of cool, wet and foggy winters and cool to warm cloudy summers.

Overview 

The reserve was established in 1999 (H.R. 2107, Title V. Sec.501.) The reserve was created after a 15-year effort to save the ancient ecosystem (with some trees estimated at over two thousand years old), from being clearcut.

These were included in the purchase to protect the watershed related to the old-growth forest. The logging company ghost town of Falk is within the reserve.

According to the BLM, "the reserve is set aside to protect and preserve the ecological and wildlife values in the area, particularly the stands of old-growth redwood that provide habitat for the threatened Marbled Murrelet, Northern Spotted Owl, native salmon stocks, and other old growth forest dependent species..." It also protects stream systems that provide habitat for the threatened coho salmon.

Other forest trees in the reserve include Douglas-fir, tanoak, Sitka spruce, western red ceder, western hemlock and red alder. There are limited distribution (CNPS list 4) plants in the reserve, including the heart-shaped twayblade and Kellogg's lily.

The Headwaters Forest Reserve is one of the few remaining refuges for the marbled murrelet, an endangered seabird. Marbled murrelets make their nests on large redwood tree branches between March 25 and September 15. The seabird nesting can be disastrously disrupted by human activity. During breeding season, approximately June 25 to August 1, visitors are prohibited from entering the forest.

History
By the late 20th century, most of the forest was owned by the defunct Pacific Lumber Company, under the leadership of Charles Hurwitz and his company Maxxam, Inc, as the result of a hostile takeover in 1985. Maxxam, Inc. changed logging policies at Pacific Lumber Company, replacing it with clearcutting. The untouched portion is dense, old-growth forest with pristine watershed conditions.
 
The area was discovered and named in March 1987 by activist Greg King after a solo hike throughout Pacific Lumber's northern ancient redwood holdings. A journalist, King pioneered redwood tree-sitting and staged other direct actions over a five-year period to draw national attention to Maxxam's liquidation of the world's last privately held ancient redwood groves. Headwaters Forest Reserve is the largest area of old-growth redwoods protected as a result of the Redwood Summer protests.

An agreement between Department of the Interior and Pacific Lumber Company was crafted in September, 1996. The agreement has two main parts: first, it provided $380 million of public funds for the purchase of the reserve.  Second, it required a Habitat Conservation Plan (HCP) be developed and approved to allow limited logging on the remaining  of Pacific Lumber Company timberland.

Public Law 105-83 was the federal legislation authorizing the acquisition. H.R. 2107 was passed by the US Congress in October 1997 which committed the government's share of $250 million of the  purchase price. California provided its share of $130 million in Chapter 615, Statutes of 1998 with a requirement of stricter conditions regarding the Habitat Conservation Plan. Specifically, wider no-cut buffer zones, prohibitions on logging in certain areas, and a requirement for watershed analysis. This legislation established a specific boundary with access points, called for joint federal-state acquisition with the Bureau of Land Management, the managing agency and the State of California having a conservation easement, and required a management plan for the forest. The California state easement gives the state oversight responsibility to ensure "all human activities with the Headwaters Forest shall be consistent with the stated goals and purposes..." The California Department of Fish and Wildlife represents the state's interest. Chapter 615 authorized purchase of two additional portions, the Owl Creek, and the Grizzly Creek properties. It provided Humboldt County with $12 million as economic assistance.

This had been the site of decades of protests called "Headwaters" (1997–2009), a fight against the logging policies of the then-privately owned forest.

See also
Death of David Chain
Judi Bari
Julia Butterfly Hill, and her tree "Luna"
 Forest Reserve Act of 1891, United States

References

External links
 Area map, from California Dept. of Fish and Game 
Official Website
Headwaters Forest Reserve National Conservation Area 
Bay Area Coalition for Headwaters 

Old-growth forests
Eureka, California
Protected areas of Humboldt County, California
Forests of California
Nature reserves in California
Bureau of Land Management areas in California
Units of the National Landscape Conservation System
Forest reserves
1999 establishments in California
Protected areas established in 1999
Pacific Lumber Company